Varetada is a small village in the municipality of Amfilochia, Aetolia-Acarnania, western Greece. Its population is 342 (2011 census). Situated in the southern part of the Makrynoros mountains, its altitude is 480 meters above the sea level. Varetada is 10 km east of Amfilochia. In the village there is the church of Saint Demetrius and an old monastery.

Population

Bibliography

Domi Encyclopedia - Vol III - pg. 248 - Tegopoulou-Maniatea - Athens, 1996
 Stamatelatos M.& Vamva F. - Geographical Dictionary of Greece (Γεωγραφικό λεξικό της Ελλάδας) - Volume I, pg. 99 - To Vima - newspaper edition - Athens, 2006

External links
 Varetada on GTP Travel Pages

See also

List of settlements in Aetolia-Acarnania

References

Populated places in Aetolia-Acarnania